Nidularium campos-portoi is a plant species in the genus Nidularium. This species is endemic to Brazil.

References

campos-portoi
Flora of Brazil